Cığatelli (also, Dzhigatally and Dzhygatelli) is a village and municipality in the Qabala Rayon of Azerbaijan.  It has a population of 560.

References 

Populated places in Qabala District